Richard Igbineghu-Bango (born 21 April 1968) is a Nigerian boxer. At the 1992 Summer Olympics he won the silver medal in the men's super heavyweight (+ 91 kg) category.

Olympic results
Defeated Gytis Juškevičius (Lithuania), KO 2
Defeated Svilen Rusinov (Bulgaria), 9-7
Lost to Roberto Balado (Cuba), 2-13

Professional career
Fighting under the name Richard Bango, Igbineghu turned pro in 1994 with moderate success. Although he began his career 16-0, Bango took three years off, from 1996-99. At the advanced age of 36, Bango took on his first real challenge, goliath Nikolay Valuev. Bango was TKO'd in the 6th round. In 2006, Bango dropped his second loss, to a young Alexander Povetkin, via a 2nd-round KO.

Professional boxing record

|-
|align="center" colspan=8|17 Wins (13 knockouts, 4 decisions), 2 Losses (2 knockouts, 0 decisions)
|-
| align="center" style="border-style: none none solid solid; background: #e3e3e3"|Result
| align="center" style="border-style: none none solid solid; background: #e3e3e3"|Record
| align="center" style="border-style: none none solid solid; background: #e3e3e3"|Opponent
| align="center" style="border-style: none none solid solid; background: #e3e3e3"|Type
| align="center" style="border-style: none none solid solid; background: #e3e3e3"|Round
| align="center" style="border-style: none none solid solid; background: #e3e3e3"|Date
| align="center" style="border-style: none none solid solid; background: #e3e3e3"|Location
| align="center" style="border-style: none none solid solid; background: #e3e3e3"|Notes
|-align=center
|Loss
|
|align=left| Alexander Povetkin
|KO
|2
|04/03/2006
|align=left| Oldenburg, Niedersachsen, Germany
|align=left|
|-
|Win
|
|align=left| Marian Tudor
|TKO
|2
|20/05/2005
|align=left| Tres Cantos, Comunidad de Madrid, Spain
|align=left|
|-
|Loss
|
|align=left| Nikolay "Russian Giant" Valuev
|TKO
|6
|24/07/2004
|align=left| Frankfurt, Brandenburg, Germany
|align=left|
|-
|Win
|
|align=left| Gerson Domingos
|PTS
|6
|16/04/2004
|align=left| Leganés, Comunidad de Madrid, Spain
|align=left|
|-
|Win
|
|align=left| Armando Grueso
|TKO
|8
|21/06/2003
|align=left| Albufeira, Portugal
|align=left|
|-
|Win
|
|align=left| Adewale "Tiger" Abbey
|KO
|6
|29/03/2003
|align=left| Ibadan, Nigeria
|align=left|
|-
|Win
|
|align=left| Roy Bedwell
|TKO
|1
|24/06/2000
|align=left| Covington, Tennessee, United States
|align=left|
|-
|Win
|
|align=left| Frankie Hines
|KO
|2
|20/04/2000
|align=left| Virginia, United States
|align=left|
|-
|Win
|
|align=left| Rodney McSwain
|UD
|6
|15/04/2000
|align=left| Bayboro, North Carolina, United States
|align=left|
|-
|Win
|
|align=left| Marcus Johnson
|UD
|6
|20/07/1999
|align=left| Windsor, Ontario, Canada
|align=left|
|-
|Win
|
|align=left| George Harris
|KO
|2
|26/06/1999
|align=left| Gallatin, Tennessee, United States
|align=left|
|-
|Win
|
|align=left|Willard Lockhart
|KO
|1
|17/07/1996
|align=left| New York City, United States
|align=left|
|-
|Win
|
|align=left| Mark Johnson
|TKO
|2
|19/06/1996
|align=left| Newark, New Jersey, United States
|align=left|
|-
|Win
|
|align=left| Jihad Abdulaziz
|TKO
|3
|27/04/1996
|align=left| New York City, United States
|align=left|
|-
|Win
|
|align=left| Roy "Chicken" Little
|KO
|1
|21/11/1995
|align=left| Auburn Hills, Michigan, United States
|align=left|
|-
|Win
|
|align=left| Dennis "The Menace" Bailey
|TKO
|1
|17/02/1995
|align=left| Cumbernauld, Scotland, United Kingdom
|align=left|
|-
|Win
|
|align=left| Archie Perry
|PTS
|4
|05/11/1994
|align=left| Las Vegas, Nevada, United States
|align=left|
|-
|Win
|
|align=left| John Pierre
|TKO
|3
|25/10/1994
|align=left| Middlesbrough, Yorkshire, United Kingdom
|align=left|
|-
|Win
|
|align=left| Steve Garber
|KO
|1
|30/07/1994
|align=left| Bethnal Green, London, United Kingdom
|align=left|
|}

External links
 
 sports-reference

1968 births
Living people
Super-heavyweight boxers
Olympic boxers of Nigeria
Boxers at the 1992 Summer Olympics
Olympic silver medalists for Nigeria
Sportspeople from Ibadan
Olympic medalists in boxing
Nigerian male boxers
Medalists at the 1992 Summer Olympics
African Games gold medalists for Nigeria
African Games medalists in boxing
Competitors at the 1991 All-Africa Games